Golovachev, Golovachov, Golovachyov (feminine: Golovachova) is a Russian family name, a patronymic from the nickname Golovach ("big headed"). It is also the name of a Russian noble family raising to prominence in the 16th century.

The surname may refer to:

 Vasili Golovachov
 Aleksandr Golovachev, Soviet colonel, twice Hero of the Soviet Union
 Pavel Golovachev, Soviet ace, twice Hero of the Soviet Union
 Nikolai Nikitich Golovachev (born 1823, died 1887), a Russian general, participant in the Caucasian War and Turkestan campaigns

Russian-language surnames